Shenzhen Pingshan railway station is a high-speed railway station on the Xiamen-Shenzhen Railway. The station is located in the Pingshan District of Shenzhen City, Guangdong Province, China. The station opened to the public on 28 December 2013.

Name
It was originally designated as Shenzhen East railway station in initial government announcements. However this former name has now been used to rename Buji railway station as of December 2012. In February 2013, the name of Shenzhen Xincheng Station was adopted by the local railway bureau, however this was dismissed by national railway authorities in October 2013. This was due to existence of another Xincheng Station on the Chinese rail network. In order to avoid any repetition of names and to reflect localities better, it was deemed that the new station would be named Shenzhen Pingshan railway station, after the district of Shenzhen that it is located in.

Structure
The station features four high level platforms served by eight tracks. Keeping with current modern practice in Chinese High Speed Rail Stations, two large open squares will feature on both sides of station. The southern square, besides being a large open public space. The Northern Square will provide access for private vehicles, long-distance and local bus services.

Service
Once fully open and with a designed speed of 250 kilometers per hour, the Xiamen-Shenzhen High Speed Railway is expected to shorten the travel time between Shenzhen and Xiamen to three hours, eight hours shorter than the current trip. Ticket prices for the high-speed line are expected to be about 190 yuan for a first-class seat and 160 yuan for a second-class seat.

Metro station
There is an adjacent metro station, called Pingshan station, on Line 16 of the Shenzhen Metro.

See also
Shenzhen railway station
Shenzhen North railway station
Shenzhen East railway station
Shenzhen West railway station

References

Railway stations in Shenzhen
Railway stations in China opened in 2013